Review of Development Economics is a quarterly peer-reviewed academic journal published by John Wiley & Sons. The journal was established in 1997. This journal publishes articles on topics in development economics like growth theory, natural resources, productivity and technological change.

According to the Journal Citation Reports, the journal has a 2018 impact factor of 0.716, ranking it 37th out of 41 journals in the category "Development Studies" and 279th out of 363 journals in the category "Economics".

References

External links 
 

Wiley-Blackwell academic journals
English-language journals
Publications established in 1997
Quarterly journals
Economics journals
Development studies journals